Musashino may refer to:

 Musashino (train), a train service in Japan
 Musashino, Tokyo, a city in Greater Tokyo, Japan
 Musashino Line, a railway line in Greater Tokyo, Japan
 3249 Musashino, an asteroid
 Musashino Terrace
 Musashino (Utamaro), an ukiyo-e print set by Kitagawa Utamaro, 
 "Musashino", a short story by Doppo Kunikida
 Musashino! (AKA Musasi-no), the second season of the anime TV series Urawa no Usagi-chan
 Musashino Animation, a fictional Japanese animation studio and the setting of the anime TV series Shirobako